Višnjićevo, formerly Grk, is a village located in the municipality of Šid, Serbia. As of 2011 census, it has a population of 1,683 inhabitants.

Name
Grk was renamed after World War I to honour Filip Višnjić, who is buried in the village.

See also
 List of places in Serbia
 List of cities, towns and villages in Vojvodina

References 

Populated places in Syrmia